The 2019–20 Cruz Azul season is the 60th season in the football club's history and the 56th consecutive season in the top flight of Mexican football. Cruz Azul will compete in Liga MX, Champions League, Supercopa MX, and the Leagues Cup.

Coaching staff

Players

Squad information

Players and squad numbers last updated on 23 July 2019.Note: Flags indicate national team as has been defined under FIFA eligibility rules. Players may hold more than one non-FIFA nationality.

Transfers

In

Competitions

Overview

Supercopa MX

Torneo Apertura

League table

Results summary

Result round by round

Matches

CONCACAF Champions League

Round of 16

Quarter-finals

Leagues Cup

Torneo Clausura

League table

Results summary

Result round by round

Statistics

Squad statistics

Goals

Disciplinary record

Clean sheets

Notes

References

External links

Mexican football clubs 2019–20 season
Cruz Azul seasons
Cruz Azul